Bobang Molebetsi Phiri (born 5 May 1968) is a retired South African sprinter who specialized in the 400 metres, who competed in three consecutive Summer Olympics, starting in 1992.

He won this event at the 1992 African Championships in Athletics, and finished eighth at the 1994 Commonwealth Games.  He twice competed in the Olympics, in 1996 and 2000.

External links

1968 births
Living people
South African male sprinters
Athletes (track and field) at the 1992 Summer Olympics
Athletes (track and field) at the 1996 Summer Olympics
Athletes (track and field) at the 2000 Summer Olympics
Olympic athletes of South Africa
Athletes (track and field) at the 1994 Commonwealth Games
Commonwealth Games competitors for South Africa